Kinetic was a comic book series created by Allan Heinberg and written by Kelley Puckett and Warren Pleece and published by DC Focus, a short-lived imprint of DC Comics. The aim of the imprint was to feature super-powered characters who did not follow the traditional format of classic superhero adventures.  It was cancelled after eight issues. One Editorial Review called the book "Unbreakable or Donnie Darko."

Storyline
The series focused on Tom Morell, a high school boy suffering from a combination of medical conditions such as hemophilia, diabetes, muscular dystrophy and others.  His life at school is characterized by constant mockery and abuse, and his home life consists of his highly protective mother who fears that he could die at any moment. As an escape from his normal life, Tom immerses himself in the adventures of his favorite comic book superhero, Kinetic.  However, Tom suddenly manifests his own superpowers. The majority of the story focuses on his reactions to this sudden change and its dramatic effects on his life.

Story summary

After a bad first day a school, Tom Morell thinks of killing himself.  He is hit by a semi-trailer truck and lives, but is in shock.  He walks home and goes to bed.  He wakes the next morning thinking the prior day a dream, but sees a clue that proves it was reality.  While walking around school, he discovers that he is super-strong and invulnerable, two lifelong dreams.  Later, when his mother discovers her son's super-powers, she reacts negatively at first, but later takes it in stride.

Collected editions
The series has been collected into a trade paperback:

Kinetic (collects Kinetic #1–8, 192 pages, 2005)

Notes

References

2004 comics debuts
2004 comics endings
DC Comics titles